Lygaenocorinae is an extinct subfamily of seed bugs in the family Lygaeidae. There are at least three genera in Lygaenocorinae.

Genera
These three genera belong to the subfamily Lygaenocorinae:
 † Lygaenocoris Popov, 1961
 † Oligacanthus Hong, 1980
 † Sinolygaeus Hong, 1980

References

Lygaeidae
Prehistoric insects